

Drymophila is a bird genus in the antbird family (Thamnophilidae). It is a relative of the typical antwrens.

The genus Drymophila was introduced by the English naturalist William Swainson in 1824. The type species is the ferruginous antbird. The name of the genus combines the Ancient Greek words  for "wood" or "copse" and  "fond of".

Taxonomy and systematics

Extant species
The genus Drymophila contains the following eleven species:
 Ferruginous antbird (Drymophila ferruginea)
 Bertoni's antbird (Drymophila rubricollis)
 Rufous-tailed antbird (Drymophila genei)
 Ochre-rumped antbird (Drymophila ochropyga)
 Dusky-tailed antbird (Drymophila malura)
 Scaled antbird (Drymophila squamata)
 Striated antbird (Drymophila devillei)
 Santa Marta antbird (Drymophila hellmayri)
 Klages's antbird (Drymophila klagesi)
 East Andean antbird (Drymophila caudata)
 Streak-headed antbird (Drymophila striaticeps)

Former species
Formerly, some authorities also considered the following species (or subspecies) as species within the genus Drymophila:
Spectacled monarch (as Drymophila trivirgata)
Island monarch (as Drymophila cinerascens)
Shining flycatcher (as Drymophila alecto)

Range
Six of the Drymophila species are associated with regions of southeastern Brazil; two of these - Bertoni's and dusky-tailed antbird - also range into eastern Paraguay and extreme northeastern Argentina.

Even at their highest diversity in Brazil's Mata Atlântica, the species are almost completely parapatric, in some cases like the dusky-tailed and scaled antbird even to exclusive habitat preferences. Of course, the rampant deforestation in that region may obscure that there has been more overlap in the past. In any case, habitat fragments strongly tend to hold at most a single species.

D. devillei, the striated antbird, is a species of the southwestern quadrant of the Amazon Basin, and a disjunct population lives in north-western Ecuador and adjacent parts of Colombia.

Footnotes

References
 Rajão, Henrique & Cerqueira, Rui (2006): Distribuição altitudinal e simpatria das aves do gênero Drymophila Swainson (Passeriformes, Thamnophilidae) na Mata Atlântica [Elevational distribution and sympatry of birds of the genus Drymophila Swainson (Passeriformes, Thamnophilidae) in the Atlantic forest]. [Portuguese with English abstract] Revista Brasileira de Zoologia 23(3): 597–607.  PDF fulltext

External links
Ecuadorian birds: Report of "Long-tailed Antbird"

 
Bird genera
Taxonomy articles created by Polbot